The Shire of Cooloola was a local government area located about  north of Brisbane – the state capital of Queensland, Australia. It merged with several other LGAs to form the Gympie Region on 15 March 2008.

History
The Cooloola area was originally settled for grazing purposes.  The discovery of gold in 1867 lead to a gold rush and the development of the Mary River valley for closer agricultural pursuits.

The Widgee Division was incorporated on 11 November 1879 under the Divisional Boards Act 1879. On 3 July 1886, its western part separately incorporated as the Kilkivan Division. With the passage of the Local Authorities Act 1902, Widgee Division became the Shire of Widgee on 31 March 1903, and on 21 November 1940 moved into new premises, the former Bank of New South Wales building at 242 Mary Street, Gympie.

The Municipal Borough of Gympie was incorporated on 25 June 1880, having previously been the Gympie Division. It held, its first elections on 25 August 1880. A town hall was built in 1890. It became the Town of Gympie under the new Act on 31 March 1903, and on 7 January 1905 was proclaimed the City of Gympie by the Governor of Queensland.

On 19 March 1992, the Electoral and Administrative Review Commission, created two years earlier, produced its report External Boundaries of Local Authorities, and recommended that the City of Gympie and the Shire of Widgee should be amalgamated. The recommendation was implemented through the Local Government (Shire of Cooloola) Regulation 1993 creating the new Shire of Cooloola on 2 November 1993. The first elections were held on 27 November 1993 and Adrian McClintock, the former Widgee chairman, was elected for a four-year term. The former Widgee Shire Council Chambers at 242 Mary Street, Gympie, were used as the Cooloola Shire Council Chambers.

On 15 March 2008, under the Local Government (Reform Implementation) Act 2007 passed by the Parliament of Queensland on 10 August 2007, Cooloola merged with the Shire of Kilkivan and Division 3 of the Shire of Tiaro (Theebine/Gunalda areas) to form the Gympie Region. The former Cooloola Shire Council Chambers are used as the Gympie Regional Council Chambers.

Wards
On its creation, Cooloola was subdivided into four numbered divisions, containing 2, 4, 3 and 3 councillors respectively, plus an elected mayor. Before the 2000 local government elections, Division 2 was reduced to 3 councillors and a new one-councillor Division 5 was created.

Towns and localities
The Shire of Cooloola included the following settlements:

Gympie area:
 Gympie
 Araluen
 Chatsworth
 Glanmire
 Jones Hill
 Kybong
 Monkland
 Southside
 Tamaree
 The Dawn
 Two Mile
 Veteran
 Victory Heights

Widgee area:
 Amamoor
 Brooloo
 Carters Ridge
 Cooloola
 Cooloola Cove
 Dagun
 Glastonbury
 Goomboorian
 Imbil
 Kandanga
 Kia Ora
 Melawondi
 Mothar Mountain
 Moy Pocket
 Pie Creek
 Rainbow Beach
 The Palms
 Tin Can Bay1
 Traveston
 Wolvi

1 - split with Fraser Coast Region

Population

* Numbers in italics relate to non-existing entities.

Mayors and Chairmen

Cooloola Shire Chairmen
 Mick Venardos OAM (1997–2008)
 Adrian McClintock (1993–1997)

Gympie City Mayors
 Joan Dodt (1988–1993)
 Mick Venardos (1976–1988)
 James Kidd (1970–1976)
 Ronald Witham (1941–1970)
 Luke Thomas (1937–1941)
 Dr Luther Morris (1931–1937)
 Alexander Glasgow (1930–1931)
 Luke Thomas (1927–1930)
 George Thomas (1924–1927)
 Luke Thomas (1920–1924)
 David Elder Reid (1903-1904)

Widgee Shire Chairmen
 Adrian McClintock (1979–1993)
 Kevin De Vere (1976–1979), uncle of Australian Prime Minister Kevin Rudd
 Michael MacDonnell (1973–1976)
 William Buchanan (1969–1973)
 William Hubbard Kidd (1924–1969)
 Joseph Tatnell (1921–1924)

References

Further reading
 
  (28 pages)

External links

 University of Queensland: Queensland Places: Cooloola Shire
 
 
 

Former local government areas of Queensland
2008 disestablishments in Australia
Populated places disestablished in 2008
1993 establishments in Australia